David Lake is the name of:

 David Lake (architect) (born 1950s), American architect
 David Lake (coach) (born 1964), Australian rules football coach, coached Gold Coast in the AFL Women's for the 2020 and 2021 seasons
 David Lake (winemaker) (1943–2009), American winemaker
 David Lake (writer) (1929–2016), Indian-born Australian science fiction writer, poet, and literary critic
 David A. Lake, American political scientist and president of the American Political Science Association